Marcela Ximena Hernando Pérez (born 12 February 1960) is a Chilean politician and physician who currently serves as Minister of Mining.

References

External links
 

1960 births
Living people
University of Chile alumni
University of Paris alumni
Catholic University of the North alumni
University of Barcelona alumni
Adolfo Ibáñez University alumni
21st-century Chilean politicians
Party for Democracy (Chile) politicians
Radical Social Democratic Party of Chile politicians
Radical Party of Chile politicians
Women government ministers of Chile
Chilean Ministers of Mining